The 1992 Buffalo Bills season was the 33rd season for the team in the National Football League (NFL). The Buffalo Bills finished the National Football League's 1992 season with a record of 11 wins and 5 losses, and finished second in the AFC East division. The Bills qualified for their third straight Super Bowl appearance, but lost to the Dallas Cowboys 52–17. This would be the only time the Bills did not finish first in the AFC Eastern Division from 1988 to 1993.

Season summary
The season is notable for Buffalo's first playoff game in this year, known as "The Comeback", in which the Bills, down 35–3, ended up winning in overtime. The game has since gone down in NFL lore. The game was the first of three Buffalo playoff wins (the two others were at Pittsburgh and at Miami) that allowed the Bills to win their third consecutive AFC Championship. In Super Bowl XXVII, Dallas beat Buffalo, 52–17.

In Week Two of the season, the Bills traveled to San Francisco, defeating the 49ers 34–31. The matchup was notable for being the first game in NFL history without a punt by either team.

Offseason

NFL Draft

Personnel

Staff

Roster

Schedule

Game summaries

Week 1 

Source: Pro-Football-Reference.com
    
    
    
    
    
    
    
    

Hosting the L.A. Rams, the Bills picked off Jim Everett four times and limited the Rams to 215 total yards. Thurman Thomas led a 207-yard rushing attack for the Bills as Jim Kelly needed only 106 passing yards and two scores for the 40–7 win.

Week 2

Buffalo's 34–31 win over the San Francisco 49ers was the first game in NFL history in which neither team punted. Over 1,000 yards in combined offense for both teams.

Week 3

The Indianapolis Colts were limited to nine first downs, 140 total yards, and three interceptions (one by quarterback/punter Tom Tupa) in a 38–0 Bills shutout.

Week 4

The winless Patriots held off the Bills for a 6–0 Bills lead at halftime before 35 Buffalo points led to yet another Buffalo runaway win, 41–7.

Week 5

Dan Marino ended Buffalo's season-opening win streak, throwing three touchdowns and 282 total yards. Jim Kelly was intercepted four times as the Dolphins won 37–10.

Week 6

The Bills flew to Los Angeles and were rudely greeted by the 1–4 Raiders; they sacked Jim Kelly five times and picked him off once, storming to a 20–3 win.

Week 8 

    
    
    
    
    
    
    
    

The Jets hosted the Bills in a back-and-forth affair.  The Bills led 17–13 in the fourth before Brad Baxter ran in a one-yard score, but Kelly led the Bills downfield and found Thurman Thomas from twelve yards out and the 24–20 Bills win.

Week 9

The Patriots traveled to Rich Stadium and the two teams managed six turnovers and just 484 total yards. The Bills fell behind 7–0 on Vincent Brown's 25-yard fumble return score, then scored 16 unanswered points on two touchdowns and a safety when Shawn McCarthy was downed in the endzone.

Week 10

Week 11

Week 12

Buffalo set an NFL record by rushing for 315 yards in a game as the Atlanta Falcons managed 174 yards of total offense and were hammered 41–14.

Week 13

Week 14

The Bills fell to the Jets 24–17 in a game the Jets needed far more than the Bills following a paralyzing injury to Dennis Byrd; the Jets had needed emotional counseling all week leading to the game, and came out inspired when coach Bruce Coslet told players beforehand that Byrd was recovering movement. Brad Baxter ran in two touchdowns; after the Bills tied the game 17–17 Brian Washington intercepted Kelly and scored. Following the 24–17 Jets win, both teams met at midfield in prayer for Dennis Byrd.

Week 15

The Bills scored the first 24 points, opening up on a triple lateral to Kelly who then unloaded a 64-yard score to wide open Don Beebe.  The Broncos started Tommy Maddox with John Elway out for the fourth straight game, then put in Shawn Moore who threw three picks; the two combined for 250 yards passing.

Week 16

Week 17

At the Astrodome Jim Kelly was intercepted once and injured in the final game of the season, forcing Frank Reich to take over as starting quarterback to begin the playoffs. Reich was picked off twice as the Oilers behind Warren Moon and Cody Carlson stormed to a 27–3 win, securing a wildcard playoff berth, where one week later they would travel to Buffalo to face Reich again.

Standings

Playoffs

Wild Card 

Frank Reich's defining moment in his pro career is actually another comeback, this one often called the greatest comeback in NFL playoff history. It was also the largest comeback in NFL history, with the Bills overcoming a 32-point deficit, until 2022, when the Minnesota Vikings overcame a 33-point deficit against the Indianapolis Colts.
In the playoffs following the 1992 season against the Houston Oilers. Reich led the Bills on a 35–3 run in the second half before overtime, en route to a 41–38 victory on a Steve Christie field goal.  Reich would help the Bills defeat the Pittsburgh Steelers in the divisional round before once again giving the team back to Kelly, who led them into Super Bowl XXVII, where they were annihilated by the Dallas Cowboys 52–17. Reich had to enter the game when starter Jim Kelly was forced out of the game with a knee injury during the 2nd quarter.

HOU – Jeffires 3-yard pass from Moon (Del Greco kick) 7–0 HOU
BUF – FG Christie 36-yards 7–3 HOU
HOU – Slaughter 7-yard pass from Moon (Del Greco kick) 14–3 HOU
HOU – Duncan 26-yard pass from Moon (Del Greco kick) 21–3 HOU
HOU – Jeffires 27-yard pass from Moon (Del Greco kick) 28–3 HOU
HOU – McDowell 58-yard interception return (Del Greco kick) 35–3 HOU
BUF – K. Davis 1-yard run (Christie kick) 35–10 HOU
BUF – Beebe 38-yard pass from Reich (Christie kick) 35–17 HOU
BUF – Reed 26-yard pass from Reich (Christie kick) 35–24 HOU
BUF – Reed 18-yard pass from Reich (Christie kick) 35–31 HOU
BUF – Reed 17-yard pass from Reich (Christie kick) 38–35 BUF
HOU – FG Del Greco 26-yards 38–38 tie
BUF – FG Christie 32-yards 41–38 BUF

Divisional

Conference Championship

Super Bowl 

The Bills entered Super Bowl XXVII trying to avoid becoming the first team to lose three consecutive Super Bowls.  Once again the team was loaded with talent, boasting 12 Pro Bowl selections. During the regular season, Buffalo's no-huddle offense ranked as the number two offense in the league (6,114 yards) and ranked as the number one rushing offense (2,436). Running back Thurman Thomas rushed for 1,487 yards and 9 touchdowns during the regular season, while also catching 58 passes for 626 yards and another 3 touchdowns. Running back Kenneth Davis rushed for 613 yards, caught 15 passes for 80 yards, and added another 251 yards returning kickoffs. Quarterback Jim Kelly had 269 out of 462 completions for 3,457 yards, 23 touchdowns, and 19 interceptions. Wide receiver Andre Reed lead the team with 65 receptions for 913 yards and 3 touchdowns, receiver James Lofton contributed 51 receptions for 786 yards and 6 touchdowns, and wide receiver Don Beebe had 33 receptions for 554 and 2 touchdowns. Also tight end Pete Metzelaars recorded 30 receptions for 298 yards and 6 touchdowns.  The Bills also had one of the best offensive lines in the NFL, led by Pro Bowlers Will Wolford, Jim Ritcher, and Howard Ballard, along with center Kent Hull.

On defense, the line was anchored by tackles Bruce Smith (14 sacks) and Jeff Wright (6 sacks, 1 fumble recovery), who were fully recovered after missing almost all of the previous season due to injuries. The Bills were once again led by their trio of linebackers Darryl Talley (77 tackles, 4 sacks), Shane Conlan (66 tackles, 2 sacks, 1 interception), and Pro Bowler Cornelius Bennett (52 tackles, 4 sacks, 3 fumble recoveries).  The defensive secondary was aided by the emergence of second year defensive back Henry Jones, who led the NFL with 8 interceptions, returning them for 263 yards and 2 touchdowns. Defensive back Mark Kelso recorded 7 interceptions, while Pro Bowl defensive back Nate Odomes had 5.

However, the Bills quest for a third consecutive Super Bowl suffered a major setback when they lost the final game of the season to the Houston Oilers. The loss caused the Bills to finish with an 11–5 record, losing the AFC East title to the Miami Dolphins based on tiebreaking rules, and thus making them a wild card team for the playoffs. Thus, even if they won their first playoff game, they would have to win two on the road to make the Super Bowl. To make matters worse, Kelly also suffered strained knee ligaments during the loss to the Oilers and had to miss the first 2 playoff games. Furthermore, their first opponent in the playoffs ended up being the Oilers. A headline on a Buffalo newspaper stated the Bills situation: "Bills Begin The Longest Road Today."

Starting lineups 
Source:

Scoring Summary
BUF – TD: Thurman Thomas 2-yard run (Steve Christie kick) 7–0 BUF
DAL – TD: Jay Novacek 23-yard pass from Troy Aikman (Lin Elliott kick) 7–7 tie
DAL – TD: Jimmie Jones 2-yard fumble return (Lin Elliott kick) 14–7 DAL
BUF – FG: Steve Christie 21 yards 14–10 DAL
DAL – TD: Michael Irvin 19-yard pass from Troy Aikman (Lin Elliott kick) 21–10 DAL
DAL – TD: Michael Irvin 18-yard pass from Troy Aikman (Lin Elliott kick) 28–10 DAL
DAL – FG: Lin Elliott 20 yards 31–10 DAL
BUF – TD: Don Beebe 40-yard pass from Frank Reich (Steve Christie kick) 31–17 DAL
DAL – TD: Alvin Harper 45-yard pass from Troy Aikman (Lin Elliott kick) 38–17 DAL
DAL – TD: Emmitt Smith 10-yard run (Lin Elliott kick) 45–17 DAL
DAL – TD: Ken Norton Jr. 9-yard fumble return (Lin Elliott kick) 52–17 DAL

Awards and records 
 Fewest Rushing Yards allowed in NFL, 1395 yards
 Led NFL in Total Yards Rushing, 2436 yards
 Led AFC in Points Scored, 381
 Led AFC in Yards Gained, 5893
 Set NFL record for most rushing yards by a club in one game (315)
 Steve Christie, Tied NFL record, Most Field Goals Attempted in a Playoff Game (6)
 Steve Christie, Tied NFL record, Most Field Goals Made in a Playoff Game (5)
 Henry Jones, Tied NFL Lead, 8 Interceptions
 Steve Tasker, Pro Bowl MVP
 Thurman Thomas, AFC Leader, 12 Touchdowns

References

External links 
 Bills on Pro Football Reference
 Bills on jt-sw.com
 Bills Stats on jt-sw.com

Buffalo Bills
American Football Conference championship seasons
Buffalo Bills seasons
Buff